Abstraction is a process or result of generalization, removal of properties, or distancing of ideas from objects.

Abstraction may also refer to:

 Abstraction (art), art unconcerned with the literal depiction of things from the visible world
 Abstraction (computer science), a process of hiding details of implementation in programs and data
 Abstraction layer, an application of abstraction in computing
 Hardware abstraction, an abstraction layer on top of hardware
 Abstraction (linguistics), use of terms for concepts removed from the objects to which they were originally attached
 Abstraction (mathematics), a process of removing the dependence of a mathematical concept on real-world objects
 Hypostatic abstraction, a formal operation that transforms a predicate into a relation
 Lambda abstraction, a definition of an anonymous function that produces a valid term in lambda calculus
 Abstraction (sociology), a process of considering sociological concepts at a more theoretical level
 Nucleophilic abstraction, a nucleophilic attack which causes part or all of a ligand to be removed from a metal
 Water abstraction, the process of taking water from any source
 Abstracting electricity, the crime of diverting electricity around an electricity meter and/or using it without paying for it
 "Abstraction", a song by Sara Groves from her album Tell Me What You Know

See also
 Abstract (disambiguation)
 Abstracting service
 Abstract art, a movement in 20th-century Western art